The PCL-171 is an assault-vehicle-mounted, 122 mm self-propelled howitzer used by the Chinese People's Liberation Army Ground Force. The designation 'PCL' is an acronym derived from pinyin.

Development
The PCL-171 made its first public appearance during a CCTV report of an exercise in December 2020. According to the report, it entered service in the second half of 2020.

It was designed as an even more mobile and lightweight platform to complement the PCL-161, which is based on a larger truck chassis but also equipped with a 122 mm howitzer.

Design
Each battery consists of 6 PCL-171 guns, command vehicles, ammunition vehicles, reconnaissance vehicles and other equipment. Some of the non-gun vehicles are based on Dongfeng Mengshi CTL181A 4×4 armoured vehicles, with at least two variants in service. The command vehicle has communications equipment mounted on the vehicle while the reconnaissance vehicle is fitted with a counter-battery radar system, including a radar antenna and an opto-electronic sight mounted on an elevating mast.

Gun 
The howitzer has a maximum firing range of 18- 22 km with conventional ammunition and up to 27 - 40 km with extended range ammunition. Each vehicle can carry 28 rounds of 122mm rounds, for a total of 168 rounds of rounds for a battery of 6 guns.

Vehicle 
The PCL-171 is based on Dongfeng Mengshi 6X6 assault vehicle chassis, specifically the CTL181A variant.

After the gun enters its firing position, 2 front hydraulic jacks and 2 back hoes can be automatically lowered to increase stability.

Deployment 
In April 2020, at least 6 PCL-171s were deployed in a training exercise in an unknown location.

Operators

Current operators

References

External links 
https://www.youtube.com/watch?v=38VYT_23430 - Documentary featuring PCL-171
Self-propelled artillery of the People's Republic of China
Wheeled self-propelled howitzers
Military vehicles introduced in the 2020s